The Brussels City Museum is a municipal museum on the Grand-Place/Grote Markt of Brussels, Belgium. Conceived in 1860 and inaugurated in 1887, it is dedicated to the history and folklore of the City of Brussels from its foundation into modern times, which it presents through paintings, sculptures, tapestries, engravings, photos and models, including a notable scale-representation of the town during the Middle Ages.

This building, erected between 1504 and 1536, was rebuilt in the 19th century in its current neo-Gothic style by the architect . Since 1998, is also listed as a UNESCO World Heritage Site, as part of the square. It can be accessed from the premetro (underground tram) station Bourse/Beurs (on lines 3 and 4), as well as the bus stop / (on line 95).

History

Medieval structures
Brussels' Town Hall was erected in stages, between 1401 and 1455, on the south side of the Grand-Place/Grote Markt, transforming the square into the seat of municipal power. To counter this, from 1504 to 1536, the Duke of Brabant ordered the construction of a large Flamboyant edifice across from the city hall to house his administrative services. It was erected on the site of the first cloth and bread markets, which were no longer in use.

The building was first called the Duke's House, but when Charles V, Duke of Brabant since 1506, was crowned King of Spain in 1516, it became known as the King's House. During Charles' reign, the building was completely redone by his court architect  in a late Gothic style very similar to the contemporary design, although without towers or galleries. The projects were presented in 1514 and the construction took place between 1515 and 1536.

In 1568, two statesmen, Lamoral, Count of Egmont and Philip de Montmorency, Count of Horn, who had spoken out against the policies of King Philip II in the Spanish Netherlands, were beheaded in front of the King's House. This triggered the beginning of the armed revolt against Spanish rule, of which William of Orange took the lead.

Destruction and rebuilding
The King's House suffered extensive damage in 1695 from the bombardment of Brussels by a French army under Marshal François de Neufville, duc de Villeroy. The building was then roughly restored by the architect  in 1697. A second more thorough restoration followed in 1767 when it received a neoclassical portal and a large roof pierced with three oeil-de-boeuf windows. The statues of saints accompanying the Virgin Mary were replaced by those of an imperial eagle and a heraldic lion. This also led to the disappearance of the fountain from the portal.

In the late 18th century, the building served as a / ("House of the People") during the occupation of Brussels by French Revolutionaries. Having become national property, it was ceded to the City of Brussels, which sold it in 1811 to the Marquis . The latter did not keep it long; he resold it in 1817. The new owner rented it for the most diverse uses: from a court, to a temporary prison, a storage space for the British cavalry after the Battle of Waterloo, a rehearsal room of the School of Dance of the Theatre of La Monnaie, and a library.

In 1864, a new fountain made by the sculptor Charles-Auguste Fraikin was installed, topped with statues of the Counts of Egmont and Horn, on the site of their execution.

Neo-Gothic building
By the mid-19th century, the state of the building had deteriorated and a comprehensive renovation was sorely needed. Under the impulse of the city's then-mayor, Charles Buls, it was reconstructed once again between 1874 and 1896, in its current neo-Gothic form, by the architect , in the style of his mentor Eugène Viollet-le-Duc. On that occasion, Jamaer built two galleries and a central tower. He also adorned the facade with statues and other decorations. At the rear, he added a new, much more sober wing in Flemish neo-Renaissance style. The new King's House was officially inaugurated in 1896.

During the works, the fountain-sculpture of the Counts of Egmont and Horn was moved to the Square du Petit Sablon/Kleine Zavelsquare, where it now has its back to the Egmont Palace. Despite the fountain's move, the memory of the martyrs is still present at the site of their execution through commemorative plaques in French and Dutch, present since 1911 on either side of the entrance to the building, and replacing a previous plaque written only in French and sealed in the sidewalk.

The current building, whose interior was renovated in 1985, has housed the Brussels City Museum since 1887. From 1928, the entire building was assigned to the museum's collections. After transformations, it reopened its doors in 1935 on the occasion of the Brussels International Exposition. In 1936, it was designated a historic site at the same time as the Town Hall, and in 1998 a UNESCO World Heritage Site with the rest of the Grand-Place.

Highlights
The Brussels City Museum features more than 7,000 items, including artefacts, paintings and tapestries from Brussels' history, such as the Town Hall's original sculptures. There are two dioramas of the city of Brussels in its early days and as it began to flourish in the 1500s. The museum's painting collections include works by the Flemish Primitive Aert van den Bossche (15th century) and the French historical painter Charles Meynier (18th century).

The original statue of Manneken Pis is on view on the top floor. Many items of the statue's wardrobe, consisting of around one thousand different costumes, could also be viewed in a permanent exhibition inside the museum until February 2017, when a specially designed museum, called Garderobe MannekenPis, opened its doors nearby at 19, /.

The City Museum is open every day except Mondays from 10 a.m. to 5 p.m. On the first Sunday of every month, admission to the museum is free.

See also

 History of Brussels
 Culture of Belgium
 Belgium in "the long nineteenth century"

References

Notes

Bibliography
 
 
 
 
 
 
 

Museums in Brussels
City of Brussels
Protected heritage sites in Brussels
World Heritage Sites in Belgium
Tourist attractions in Brussels
History museums in Belgium
City museums in Belgium
Museums established in 1887
1887 establishments in Belgium